Adrian Richard Cashmore (born 23 July 1973 in Tokoroa, New Zealand), is a rugby player who played for Auckland and Bay of Plenty provincially, and the Auckland Blues and Chiefs in Super Rugby. He also played professionally in Japan and for Welsh region the Ospreys in the Celtic League. He also made two appearances for New Zealand.

He played predominantly at fullback and was usually his team's goalkicker. His career began with Bay of Plenty in 1992, however in 1993 he made the move north to Auckland where he spent the bulk of his career. He amassed 619 points in the Super Rugby competition for the Auckland Blues and 826 points for Auckland provincially. During his time in Auckland he won two Super Rugby titles with the Blues, in 1996 and 1997, two NPC titles with Auckland, in 1995 and 1996, and twice won the Ranfurly shield, also in 1995 and 1996.

In 2000 he left New Zealand to play in Japan, where he remained until 2004. Upon returning to New Zealand he spent the 2004 and 2005 seasons with Bay of Plenty provincially and the Chiefs in Super Rugby, winning the Ranfurly Shield and reaching the NPC semi finals in 2004 with the former. In 2005 he again went offshore and spent a season with the Ospreys before retiring in 2006.

External links

1973 births
Bay of Plenty rugby union players
Living people
New Zealand international rugby union players
Māori All Blacks players
New Zealand rugby union players
Rugby union players from Tokoroa
Auckland rugby union players
Blues (Super Rugby) players
Chiefs (rugby union) players
Ospreys (rugby union) players
Rugby union fullbacks
Rugby union wings